Tilburstow Hill is a   nature reserve south-east of Godstone in Surrey. It is managed by the Surrey Wildlife Trust.

This is a semi-natural broadleaved wood on the Greensand Ridge, with sweet chestnut, sessile and pedunculate oak, beech, silver birch and hazel. Ground flora include dog's mercury and garlic mustard.

There is access from Rabies Heath Road.

References

Surrey Wildlife Trust